Tinker Tailor Soldier Spy is a 1979 British seven-part spy drama by the BBC. John Irvin directed and Jonathan Powell produced this adaptation of John le Carré's novel Tinker Tailor Soldier Spy (1974). The serial, which stars Alec Guinness, Alexander Knox, Ian Richardson, Michael Jayston, Bernard Hepton, Anthony Bate, Ian Bannen, George Sewell and Michael Aldridge, was shown in the United Kingdom from 10 September to 22 October 1979, and in the United States beginning on 29 September 1980.

The series was followed by Smiley's People in 1982.

Plot
George Smiley, deputy to the head of the British Secret Intelligence Service, is forced into retirement in the wake of Operation Testify, a failed spy mission to Czechoslovakia. Veteran British agent Jim Prideaux has been sent to meet a Czech general, having been told the general had information identifying a deep-cover Soviet spy planted in the highest echelons of the British Secret Intelligence Service—known as the Circus, because of its headquarters at Cambridge Circus in London.

The mission proves to be a trap, and Prideaux is captured and brutally tortured by the Soviets. The Chief of the Circus, known only as Control, is disgraced for his role in Testify, and is replaced by his rival Percy Alleline. Control's obsession with the possibility of a Soviet mole at the Circus is not shared by others in the organization, who insist that any leaks and failures at the Circus were due to Control's incompetence. On the contrary, Alleline and the rest of the new leadership team at the Circus believe that they have a mole, code-named Merlin, working for them in Moscow Centre, the KGB headquarters, passing them secrets in an operation code-named Witchcraft. Others in the British and American intelligence communities have been impressed with the information produced by Witchcraft, and Alleline and his team are regarded as a refreshing change from Control.

More than a year after Testify and the shake-up at the Circus, Ricki Tarr, a British agent gone missing in Lisbon, turns up in England with new evidence backing up Control's theory of a mole at the Circus. While on a routine mission Tarr had been approached by Irina, a low-level Soviet agent who claimed to know the identity of the mole and wanted to trade it for permission to defect. As soon as Tarr had informed the Circus of Irina's offer, she was abducted and spirited back to Russia. Tarr, convinced he had been betrayed by the mole Irina was going to identify, believed that he would also be targeted and murdered. Returning to London secretly, Tarr contacts Oliver Lacon, a senior civil servant who is the liaison between the Circus and the British Cabinet.

Before his ousting, Control had narrowed his list of suspects to five men – Roy Bland, Toby Esterhase, Bill Haydon, Percy Alleline, and George Smiley – all of whom occupied high positions in the Circus. Knowing the Soviet spy is highly placed in the Circus, Lacon cannot trust the Circus to uncover the mole or even allow its personnel to know of the investigation. Smiley, who had been fired along with Control while Control's other four suspects were promoted, is recalled by Lacon and given instructions to expose the mole. With the help of his protégé, Peter Guillam, who is still in the Circus, Smiley begins a secret investigation into the events surrounding Operation Testify, believing it will lead him to the identity of the mole, whom Moscow Centre has given the cover name Gerald.

Smiley learns that Operation Witchcraft uses a safe house to meet with Aleksey Aleksandrovich Polyakov, a Soviet agent. Polyakov appears to hand over valuable intelligence material, but this is actually "chickenfeed", and the operation is a cover by which Gerald passes valuable material to Polyakov. Smiley forces Toby Esterhase to reveal the location of the safe house. Tarr is sent to Paris, from where he sends a coded message to Alleline about "information crucial to the well-being of the Service". This triggers an emergency meeting between Gerald and Polyakov at the safe house, where Smiley and Guillam are lying in wait.

The mole is revealed to be Bill Haydon. Haydon is debriefed by Smiley but is killed by Jim Prideaux before he can be exchanged with the Russians.

Cast

 Alec Guinness as George Smiley / "Beggarman"
 Alexander Knox as Control
 Michael Jayston as Peter Guillam
 Anthony Bate as Oliver Lacon
 Bernard Hepton as Toby Esterhase / "Poorman"
 Ian Richardson as Bill Haydon / "Tailor"
 Ian Bannen as Jim Prideaux
 Hywel Bennett as Ricki Tarr
 Michael Aldridge as Percy Alleline / "Tinker"
 Terence Rigby as Roy Bland / "Soldier"
 George Sewell as Mendel
 Beryl Reid as Connie Sachs
 Joss Ackland as Jerry Westerby
 Siân Phillips as Ann Smiley
 Frank Moorey as Lauder Strickland
 Nigel Stock as Roddy Martindale
 John Standing as Sam Collins
 Thorley Walters as Tufty Thessinger
 John Wells as Headmaster
 Patrick Stewart as Karla
 Mandy Cuthbert as Molly Purcell
 Warren Clarke as Alwyn
 Joe Praml as Paul Skordeno
 Susan Kodicek as Irina
 Alec Sabin as Fawn
 Hilary Minster as Boris
 George Pravda as Polyakov
 Duncan Jones as "Jumbo" Roach

Production
Shortly before filming began, Alec Guinness asked author John le Carré to introduce him to a real spy to aid him in preparing for his role. Le Carré invited Guinness to lunch with Sir Maurice Oldfield, who served as Chief of the British Intelligence Service from 1973 to 1978. During their meal, Guinness intently studied Oldfield for any mannerisms or quirks that he could use in his performance. When he saw Oldfield run his finger around the rim of his wine glass, he asked whether Oldfield was checking for poison—much to Oldfield's astonishment, as he was only checking how clean the glass was.

The series was shot on location in London, including some of the intelligence agency scenes which were shot in the BBC offices; in Glasgow for scenes in Czechoslovakia, at Oxford University, at Bredon School in Gloucestershire where the character Jim Prideaux was a master, and elsewhere.

Music
The end credits music, an arrangement of "Nunc dimittis" ("Lord, now lettest thou thy servant depart in peace") from the Book of Common Prayer (1662), was composed by Geoffrey Burgon for organ, strings, trumpet, and treble; the score earned Burgon the Ivor Novello Award for 1979 and reached 56 on the UK Singles Chart. The treble on the original recording, Paul Phoenix, was a tenor in the King's Singers later in his career.

Broadcast
The series was shown in the United Kingdom from 10 September to 22 October 1979, and in the United States beginning on 29 September 1980.

The overall running time is about the same.

Reception
Le Carré cited the series as his favourite film adaptation of his work, attributing this to his experience collaborating with Guinness.

In a retrospective review in The New York Times, Mike Hale lauded Guinness's performance, ("It's conventional wisdom that Guinness's performance is a landmark in TV history, and you won't get an argument here, though if you're watching it for the first time, you may wonder at the start what all the fuss is about.") and cited the production's pacing versus current techniques, stating, "Audiences used to the pace of the modern TV crime or espionage drama will need to reorientate themselves." Retrospective reviewers favourably compared the series with the 2011 film version, also citing le Carré's praise of the original and referring to Guinness's performance.

Awards

Home video
Tinker, Tailor, Soldier, Spy was released on VHS in 1991 (BBCV 4605) and 1999 (BBCV 6788). It was released on Region 2 DVD in 2003 (BBCDVD 1180), and in 2011 bundled with Smiley's People (BBCDVD 3535). A remastered Blu-ray edition was released in 2019 (BBCBD0465).

References

External links

BBC television dramas
Espionage television series
Television series about the Cold War
1970s British television miniseries
BAFTA winners (television series)
John le Carré
1979 British television series debuts
1979 British television series endings
1970s British drama television series
Television shows based on British novels
Television shows set in Oxford
English-language television shows
Secret Intelligence Service in fiction